Karel Tichota (born 19 January 1975) is a retired Czech football defender.

References

1975 births
Living people
Czech footballers
FK Hvězda Cheb players
FK Chmel Blšany players
SFC Opava players
FC Slavia Karlovy Vary players
Association football defenders
Czech First League players
Czech football managers